Emirler Archaeological Site and City Forest Museum is a small museum located in Mersin Province, southern Turkey, exhibiting archaeological artifacts found at site and some fauna of the city forest.

Location
The museum is next to Emirler village of Mersin Province at .Its distance to Mersin is about

Museum
The Ministry of Forestry decided to establish a picnic area in the southern slopes of Toros Mountains where Mersin is in the view. During the construction, some archaeological remains were unearthed. Following a rescue excavations a Roman road, a necropolis, sarcophagi and a  cistern were also unearthed along with other finds such as a 1st-century unguentarium which were transferred to Mersin Archaeological Museum. The hitherto unknown settlement may be a Hellenistic, Roman or early Byzantine settlement.

The Forestry Museum
In the same area Ministry of Forestry established a forestry museum in a wooden cottage. In the museum, insects, butterflies and birds of the forest are displayed. There is also a  walking track.

References

Museums in Mersin Province
Archaeological museums in Turkey
Natural history museums in Turkey
Forestry museums
Yenişehir, Mersin